Decommissioned and removed in late 2019. The Savoy Pier was located just to the south of the Savoy Hotel on the river Thames, and not far from the site of the old Savoy Wharf. The pier was the first central London base of Woods River Cruises Ltd. The pier was designed by Beckett Rankine in 1998 as a temporary structure and is an unusual design being restrained by transverse radial arms and longitudinal mooring cables. The contractor was Downtown Marine Construction who have since ceased trading.

It was replaced by new 140m mooring pontoon 'Woods Quay' in July 2020. It has been proposed that Savoy Pier will be relocated to Hammersmith Embankment for use for a new cross-river Thames Clipper service

Scheduled river bus services operated from Savoy Pier from April 2004, to November 2008 when they were transferred to Embankment Pier, a short distance up the Thames.

Other public transport nearby
 Embankment Pier (Thames Clippers Riverline)
 Embankment Underground station (Circle and District lines)
 Temple Underground station (Circle and District lines)
 Covent Garden Underground station (Piccadilly line)

Nearby Places
 Covent Garden
 South Bank Centre

References

London River Services
Infrastructure in London
Piers in London
City of Westminster